( 'mirror(s) in the mirror') is a composition by Arvo Pärt written in 1978, just before his departure from Estonia. The piece is in the tintinnabular style, wherein a melodic voice, operating over diatonic scales, and tintinnabular voice, operating within a triad on the tonic, accompany each other. It is about ten minutes long.

Description
The piece was originally written for a single piano and violin – though the violin has often been replaced with either a cello or a viola. Versions also exist for double bass, clarinet, horn, flugelhorn, flute, oboe, bassoon, trombone, and percussion. The piece is an example of minimal music.

The piece is in F major in 6/4 time, with the piano playing rising crotchet triads and the second instrument playing slow F major scales, alternately rising and falling, of increasing length, which all end on the note A (the mediant of F). The piano's left hand also plays notes, synchronised with the violin (or other instrument).

"Spiegel im Spiegel" in German literally can mean both "mirror in the mirror" as well as "mirrors in the mirror", referring to an infinity mirror, which produces an infinity of images reflected by parallel plane mirrors: the tonic triads are endlessly repeated with small variations as if reflected back and forth. The structure of melody is made by couple of phrases characterized by the alternation between ascending and descending movement with the fulcrum on the note A. This, with also the overturning of the final intervals between adjacent phrases (for example, ascending sixth in the questiondescending sixth in the answer), contribute to give the impression of a figure reflecting on a mirror and walking back and toward it.

In 2011, the piece was the focus of a half-hour BBC Radio 4 programme, Soul Music, which examined pieces of music "with a powerful emotional impact". Violinist Tasmin Little discussed her relationship to the piece.

Adaptation
The piece has been used in television, film, and theatre including:

Film

Dance
David Nixon's Dracula performed by the Northern Ballet (UK, 2009)
Pilobolus' Rushes in a scene choreographed using chairs. (US, 2007)
Christopher Wheeldon's 2005 ballet After the Rain, part two (Pärt's "Tabula Rasa" is the score to part one)
John Neumeier's ballet Othello (1985), the central pas de deux (Pärt's "Tabula Rasa" is the score to part two)
Mats Ek's Smoke performed by Sylvie Guillem and Niklas Ek (1995)
Stephen Mills' Desire performed by Ballet Austin (1998)

Theatre
The New York production of Eurydice, a play by Sarah Ruhl (2007)
Venezuelan production called 120 vidas x minuto ("120 Lives a Minute"), a play by Gustavo Ott (2007)
Czech production of Forgotten Light ("Zapomenuté světlo"), a play by Jakub Deml
French production of The Glass Menagerie (Tennessee Williams) a play by Daniel Jeanneteau (2016)
Canadian production of Othello, a play by William Shakespeare, directed by Ian Farthing at the St. Lawrence Shakespeare Festival (2012)

Television

 The BBC documentary Touched by Auschwitz (2015)
 The BBC documentary Auschwitz: The Nazis and 'The Final Solution'  (2005) (which also  used Fratres)
 The BBC drama Hattie (2011)
 The RTS and Colossal production documentary "Izgubljeni orden" (The Lost Medal) (2010)
 The BBC television series Criminal Justice (2009)
 The BBC medical drama Casualty (2008, 2010) and its spin-off show Holby City (2016, 2019)
 The season two episode of Supernatural, titled "What is and What Should Never Be" (2007)
 The BBC dramatisation of Elizabeth Gaskell's North and South''' (2004) 
 The BBC documentary Century of the Self by Adam Curtis (2002)
 The BBC documentary John Steinbeck: Voice of America by Melvyn Bragg (2011)
 The FOX television show The Simpsons episode 534 Yolo (2013)
 The RTÉ News, on New Year's Eve, at the end of news editions as a memorial to victims of road traffic deaths during the year
 The Carlton series The Wrong Side of the Rainbow (2001)
 The S4C television drama Gwaith/Cartref (2015).
 The BBC documentary The Secret Life of Chaos (2010) presented by Jim Al-Khalili
 The season four episode and series finale of The Good Place, titled "Whenever You're Ready" (2020)
 The BBC documentary series Modern Masters, uses it in the second episode about Henri Matisse. Presented by Alastair Sooke. (2010)
 The ITV soap opera Emmerdale (2022)

Sport
U.S. ice dancers Maia Shibutani and Alex Shibutani in their free dance titled Evolution for the season 2016-17.
Russian figure skater Kamila Valieva adapted this song as her short programme music for two seasons: 2018-2019 and 2019-2020.

 Recordings Spiegel im Spiegel was recorded by Gidon Kremer and Elena Kremer in December 1979 and featured on the 1980 album Konzert nach dem Konzert on the Eurodisc label.Spiegel im Spiegel is featured on the 1999 album Alina on the ECM New Series label. The album, which was recorded with the participation of Pärt, includes three versions of Spiegel im Spiegel, two for violin and piano and one for cello and piano, alternated with two variations of Pärt’s piano piece Für Alina. The tempo of the first version of Spiegel im Spiegel is 69 bpm (larghetto or adagio) and has a more somber feel. The tempo of the second version is faster at 85 bpm (andante) and gives the sense of pushing forward. The tempo of the third version is faster than the first and slower than the second at 78 bpm (a slower andante). Spiegel im Spiegel is featured on the 2016 album Sacred'' by Australian violinist Niki Vasilakis and features Deanna Djuric on piano.

References

External links
 BBC Radio 4 programme on "Spiegel im Spiegel"

Compositions by Arvo Pärt
1978 compositions
Instrumental duets